Badri is a 2001 Indian Tamil-language sports drama film directed by P. A. Arun Prasad.  The film stars Vijay in the titular role as a college brat who turns into a kickboxer to prove himself, whereas Bhumika plays the lead female. Monal, Vivek, Riyaz Khan and Bhupinder Singh play supporting roles. The film's soundtrack was composed by Ramana Gogula, while the background score was composed by Devi Sri Prasad. It is the official Tamil remake of the director's own Telugu film Thammudu (1999) which was based on the 1979 American film Breaking Away. 

Filming began in August 2000 and was completed by March 2001. The film had its theatrical release on 12 April 2001. The film completed 100 days theatrical run. India Today listed the film under top ten films performed by Vijay. The film marked Bhumika’s Tamil debut. It was a commercial successful venture at the box office.

Plot 
Sri Badrinatha Moorthy aka "Badri" is a happy-go-lucky youth who spends his days roaming around with his friends Azhagu, Howrah, and Joot, ogling girls and repeatedly failing his exams. His father, Viswanathan, a cafe owner, is disgusted with his irresponsibility and constantly chides him. His older brother Vetri, who is a college-level kickboxer and Viswanathan's favourite son, on the other hand, dotes on him. Janaki, aka "Jaanu", who is Badri's neighbour and childhood friend, is in love with him, but the feeling is one-sided as Badri mainly considers her as a source of money and cars; Badri constantly borrows large amounts of money from Jaanu as well as expensive cars from her father's garage to impress girls.

One day, Badri meets Mamathi, who is a rich college girl, and poses as a wealthy industrialist's son in order to impress and love her. Mamathi falls for Badri's lies and soon expresses her love to him. But when she finds out the truth, she breaks up with him and insults him in front of Viswanathan. When Viswanathan further finds out that Badri has taken large amounts of money from Jaanu, he kicks out Badri, tired of his antics.

Badri, who is now homeless, finds support from Jaanu, who advises him to be more responsible and redeem himself in Viswanathan's eyes. He realises the love Jaanu has for him and begins to reform himself. Meanwhile, Vetri is attacked and seriously injured by his kickboxing arch-rival Rohit, who happens to be Mamathi's new boyfriend and Badri's enemy as well, thus ruling him out for the final match of the inter-collegiate kickboxing championship against Rohit. Badri decides to fight for Vetri by taking his place in the final and trains hard for it. Finally he defeats Rohit in the final, thus winning the kickboxing championship. He dedicates the trophy to Vetri, reconciles with Viswanathan, and reciprocates Jaanu's love.

Cast

Production 
Badri, produced by Sri Venkateswara Art Films, was announced in August 2000 and was slated to be the remake of the Telugu film Thammudu, starring Pawan Kalyan. Arun Prasad, who directed the original, reprises his role, as did the composer Ramana Gogula. Most of the other technicians were also taken from Tollywood. Art director G. K. hired 200 technicians to create a high tech complex in Vahini studios for the film. When first announced, it was reported that Vijay would essay dual lead roles, although this claim later proved to be untrue. Bhupinder Singh was also selected to reprise his role from the original version as Rohit, the antagonist.

During the filming of a pivotal scene in the "Travelling Soldier" song, Vijay allowed a car to run over his fingers, and the shot was canned with three cameras, with the scene attracting media attention. Martial arts expert Shihan Hussaini helped with the production and features in the film in a guest appearance. Other scenes were shot at Amir Mahal in Chennai.

The film teamed up with Coca-Cola for their publicity campaign after Vijay had signed on to the soft drink company as a brand ambassador.

Release 
Badri released on 12 April 2001 and ran for 100 days in theatres. The Hindu reported that the film Badri clearly reveals the diligence and sincerity of Vijay. But would these alone make a film wholesome?" and that Monal "needs to work on her expressions". A reviewer from entertainment portal Ananda Vikatan rated the film 40 out of 100. Tamil Movies Cafe wrote "Badri moves at a fairly neat pace in the earlier part, lags a little later, and then picks up speed towards the end."

The film became Vijay's 4th consecutive successful film, after Kushi (2000), Priyamaanavale (2000) and Friends (2001).

Soundtrack 

The soundtrack of the film was composed by Ramana Gogula who composed for the original film and notably remains his first and only Tamil film he had worked so far. The lyrics were penned by Palani Bharathi.
Tracklist

References

External links 
 

2000s sports films
2000s Tamil-language films
2001 films
Films directed by P. A. Arun Prasad
Indian boxing films
Indian sports films
Tamil remakes of Telugu films